Yaser Bakhtiari (born 1982 in Rezvanshahr, Gilan province, Iran) better known by his stage name Yas, is an Iranian rapper.  He wears a Faravahar pendant, a symbol of Iranian nationalism and Zoroastrianism.
On 21 December 2011 Yas was chosen by the voters as the Artist of the Week in MTV IGGY Entitled Tehran’s Hard-Hitting MC.

Yas is one of the founders of Persian rap, and in 2013 he became the first Iranian rapper to be allowed by the Islamic Republic to legally perform in Iran.

Early life
Yas first began to listen to rap music at the age of 14 his father returned from his business trip in Germany and brought him the latest Tupac album and other hip hop songs and he was heavily influenced by them. After the sudden death of his father, he was faced with the responsibility of becoming the primary caretaker of his household with his father's debts to pay. Yas was forced to leave his college ambitions behind and begin to work and support his entire family. It was at this time that he began to write poetry which soon turned into lyrics for his music.

Music career
Yas started his work after the 2003 Bam earthquake. Devastated by the disaster, it was then, that he wrote his first song "Bam". This was the beginning of his rapping career. Yas in 2006 made a song called CD Ro Beshkan (Break The Disk) which was written about actress Zahra Amir Ebrahimi in Iran who was the victim of a Sex scandal tape. The scandal ultimately ended her career. In the song Yas criticizes the people for playing a role in her demise and asked everyone to stop spreading her shame and to get rid of the footage from their computers and cellphones. The song was listened to and downloaded by millions in Iran alone.

Yas in June 2008 made a song called Hoviate Man [my identity] describing his pride in his Iranian heritage and a mention of the controversial 300 film. Yas in 2008 made and wrote a song named "Darkam Kon" (Understand me). Yas's music was a protest to the government and for poverty and people who can't find jobs.

In May 2011 Yas made a song called "Az Chi Begam" (What Can I Say) which is a protest song for those schoolchildren who suffered from a fire in addition to injustice and misery, like their fellow countrymen. Yas criticises the negligence of the Islamic Republic of Iran in providing substandard facilities, in this case a very old oil burning heater, which caused eight 7-year-old schoolchildren burned in Doroudzan village’s school disaster.

In 2013 he became the first rapper authorized to perform by the Iranian government. In 2014 Yas decided to cooperate with Tech N9ne. The pair are the first rappers from Iran and the United States to work together musically. Their single was titled "The Sound of Unity" which was released along with a Music video.

Manner
Yas, who raps in Persian, states he was heavily influenced as a young man by Tupac Shakur albums brought back to Iran by his father, as well as the Classical Persian poetry especially Rumi. He is one of the few Persian rapper who do not use any swear words in their song
Yas theme songs is the social problems. Yas’ accomplishments paved the way for new rappers to perform in Iran.

Media appearances
Yas signed a contract with an American music publishing company Modiba. IEvergreen Publishing is also the home of the late Tupac Shakur catalogue who has granted permission for a mashup song between Yas and Tupac.

Discography

Albums
 2005: Khiabooniha
 2023: Painful (Various Artists) 'Abolfazl Amiri , Moer , Techn9ne , Pishro
| Featured Artists
| Abolfazl Amiri , Moer , Techn9ne , Reza Pishro , DJ Assad

Singles
2000: "BacheHaye Khiaboon" (Street Kids)
2002: "Bam" (Bam)
2002: "Man Khaste am" (I Am Tired)
2003: "Honey" (Honey)
2003: "Yek Nafas Begin" (Let's Say With One Breath (together))
2003: "Bia To" (You Come) (Ft Sasan)
2003: "Daftaram Dastameh" (My Notebook Is In My Hand)
2003: "Cheshmamouno Baz Konim" (We Should Open Our Eyes) (Ft N.I.M.I)
2004: "Raz" (Mystery) (Ft Sasan)
2004: "Setare Ghotbi" (polar Star)
2004: "Dardo Del" (Chat)
2004: "Donyaye Bi Rahm" (The Ruthless World)
2005: "Zehi Eshgh" (Welldone Love) (Ft Sara Naeini)
2005: "Che Roozaye Sakhti Raft" (What Difficult Days Went By)
2006: "Bi To Dige Na Aslan" (Without You, Not At All)
2006: "Na Aslan" (Not At All)
2006: "Cd Ro Beshkan" (Break The Cd)
2006: "Bayad Betoonim" (We Must Be Able To)
2007: "Hoviate Man" (My identity) 
2007: "Solh Toei" (Peace Be Upon You)
2007: "Be Omide Iran" (In The Hope Of Iran) (Ft Rastin)
2007: "Bezarin Bokoshamesh" (Let Me Kill It)
2008: "Toos Rap" (Iran's Rap) 
2008: "Sakhte" (It's Hard) (Ft Nima Allameh Dahr)
2008: "Darkam Kon" (Understand Me)
2008: "Be Donya Khosh Oomadi" (Welcome To The World)
2008: "Haminja Piyadeh Misham" (I'll Get Out Right Here)
2008: "Tamoomesh Kon" (Stop It)
2009: "Bia Kenaram Beshin To" (Come Sit Next To Me) (Ft Sasan)
2009: "Goftam Naro" (I Said Don't Go) (Ft Reza Sadeghi)
2009: "Delet Daryast" (Your heart is [like] the sea)
2009: "To Marizi" (You're Crazy) (Ft Xaniar Khosravi & Sirvan Khosravi)
2009: "Ba Man Bash" (Be With Me)
2009: "Yadet Nareh" (Don't Forget) (Ft Majid Ghafouri)
2009: "Entezar" (Wait)
2009: "Marham" (salve) 
2010: "Nisti"(You're Not) (Ft Aamin Malek)
2010: "Bekhatere Man" (For The Sake Of Me)
2010: "Ghesseye Zirzamin" (The Story Of The Undergrounds)
2010: "Vaghte Tolue Yas" (Yas Rising Time)
2010: "Sheykhe Hilegar"
2011: "Sarbaze Vatan" (Soldier of the Homeland)
2011: "Az Chi Begam" (What Can I Say)
2012: "Man Mijangam" (I'll Fight On)
2012: "Vaghte Raftan" (Time To Leave) (Ft Aamin Malek)
2012: "Trash The Club" (Ft DJ Aligator)
2013: "Faryas (Faryad E Yas)" (Shout of Yas)
2013: "Amen" (Ft Aamin Malek)
2014: "Man Edameh Midam" (I'll Continue)
2014: "Sound Of Unity" (Sedaye Ettehad) (Ft Tech N9ne (Aaron Dontez Yates)
2014: "Do Do Ta Chahar Ta" (2×2=4)
2014: "Vasiat Nameh" (Wills)
2014: "Zende Bad Iran" (Long Live Iran)
2015: "Free Style(Live Shomal)" (Norouz 94 Or Dar Rah Shomal)
2015: "Bad Shodam" (I've Become Bad)
2015: "Mosafer" (Passenger)
2015: "Hamechi Dorost Mishe" (Everything Will Be Fine)
2015: "Charsoo" (Crossroad)
2015: "Dige Nist" (No More She Is Here)
2015: "Speak" (Ft John D & Arsha Michaels)
2016: "Barcode" (Song Barcode Movie)
2016: "Boghz Yani" (Spite Means) ("Ft Aamin Malek")
2016: "Nameyi Be Farzand" (Letter To A Child)
2017: "Sarkoob" (Suppression) (Long Version)
2018: "Bande Naaf Ta Khatte Saaf" (From Cord To Smooth Line) (Ft Moer)
2019: "Esalat" (Gentility) (Ft Moer)
2019: "Sefareshi" (Special Request)
2020: "Agah" (Aware) (Ft Moer)
2020: "Lal" (Mute)
2022: "Khanevadegi 2" (Famililly 2)
2022: "Beem" (Fear)
2022: "Suffocation" (Remix) ("Ft Eminem , AbolFazl Amiri , Elfar3i , Karigar")

Music videos

 Bezarin Bokoshamesh (Let Me Kill Him)
 ba To bi Dige Na Aslan (Never without you) (Ft Aamin)
 Raaz(Mano To) (The secret between me and you) (Ft Sasan)
 Ghesseye Zirzamin (Underground Story)
 Bekhatere Man (For my sake)
 Sarbaze Vatan (Homeland Soldier)
 Trash The Club (Ft Dj Aligator & Al Agami)
 Az Chi Begam (What Can I Say)
 Vaghte Raftan (Time To Leave) (Ft Aamin)
 Faryas (Faryad E Yas) (Shout Of Yas)
 Sound Of Unity (Sedaye Ettehad) (Ft Tech N9ne)
 Mosafer (Passenger)
 Hamechi Dorost Mishe (Everything Will Be Fine)
 Nameyi Be Farzand (Letter To A Child)
 Bande Naaf Ta Khatte Saaf (From An Umbilical Cord To A Smooth Line) (Ft Moer)
 "Sefareshi" (Special Request)
 "Agah" (Aware)

Concert
 United States (University of Michigan), (San Francisco), (California) (Los Angeles) (Yale University)
 United Arab Emirates (Dubai)
 Canada (Toronto)
 England (London)
 Australia (Melbourne)
 Turkey (Istanbul)
 Germany (Hamburg) (Cologne)

Filmography
 Rock On (documentary)
 Paparazzi (documentary)
 Raad,A Woman's Story (movie)
 "Taraneh" (Song) (documentary)

References

External links

 Yastunes website

1982 births
Living people
Iranian rappers
Iranian songwriters
Iranian male actors
21st-century Iranian male singers